Qadian is a city and a municipal council in Gurdaspur district, north-east of Amritsar, situated  north-east of Batala city in the state of Punjab, India. Qadian is the birthplace of Mirza Ghulam Ahmad, the founder of the Ahmadiyya movement within Islam. It remained the headquarters of the Ahmadiyya movement until the Partition of India in 1947.

History
Qadian was established in 1530 by Mirza Hadi Baig, a religious scholar dedicated to Islam and the first Qazi in the area. Mirza Hadi Baig was from a royal household of Mirza of the Mughal Empire. He migrated from Samarkand and settled in Punjab where he was granted a vast tract of land comprising 80 villages by the emperor Babur. Because of his religious beliefs, he named the center of the 80 villages Islam Pur Qazi and governed from there. Over time, the name of the town changed to Qazi Maji, then Qadi, and eventually it became known as 'Qadian'.

Qadian and the surrounding areas later fell to the Ramgarhia Sikhs under the leadership of Jassa Singh Ramgarhia who offered the ruling Qazis, two villages which they refused. In 1834, during the rule of Maharaja Ranjit Singh, the region consisting of Qadian and five adjoining villages was given to Mirza Ghulam Murtaza, father of Ghulam Ahmad in return for military support in Kashmir, Mahadi, the Kulu valley, Peshawar and Hazara.

As the home of the Ahmadiyya Movement
A remote and unknown town, Qadian emerged as a centre of religious learning in 1889, when Mirza Ghulam Ahmad established the Ahmadiyya Muslim Community. In 1891 it became the venue for the Community's annual gatherings. Qadian remained the administrative headquarters and capital of the Ahmadiyya Caliphate until the partition of India in 1947, when much of the Community migrated to Pakistan. Following the partition, Mirza Bashir-ud-Din Mahmud Ahmad, the second Khalifa of the Community, carefully oversaw the safe migration of Ahmadis from Qadian to the newly founded state, instructing 313 men, including two of his own sons, to stay in Qadian and guard the sites holy to Ahmadis, conferring upon them the title darveshān-i qādiyān (the dervishes of Qadian) and eventually moving the headquarters to Rabwah, Pakistan.

Geography
It has an average elevation of 250 metres (820 feet).

Demographics
Qadian has a population of 23,632. Males constituted 54% of the population and females 46%. Qadian has an average literacy rate of 75%, slightly higher than the national average of 74.04%: male literacy is 78%, and female literacy is 70%. 10% of the population is under 6 years of age.

Languages 
Most of the residents of Qadian are speakers of the Punjabi language. A significant minority, about a 1/10 of the population, also speak the Urdu language.

Religion

Politics 
The city is part of the Qadian Assembly Constituency.

Notable monuments
Jamia Ahmadiyya Qadian
Aqsa Mosque, Qadian
Bahishti Maqbara cemetery
Mubarak Mosque

Hospitals
Noor Hospital

Education
Jamia Ahmadiyya Qadian

Notable people  

Although Qadian is relatively remote and has a very small population, it has many notable historical, religious and political figures;

Religious Leaders
Mirza Ghulam Ahmad

Ahmadiyya Caliphs 
Hakeem Noor-ud-Din from 1908 to 1914
Mirza Basheer-ud-Din Mahmood Ahmad from 1914 to 1965
Mirza Nasir Ahmad from 1965 to 1982
Mirza Tahir Ahmad from 1982 to 2003

Poets
 Shiv Kumar Batalvi

Military Leaders
 Dilbagh Singh
 Mirza Ghulam Murtaza
 Mirza Hadi Baig

Politicians
Tripat Rajinder Singh Bajwa 
Partap Singh Bajwa
Charanjit Kaur Bajwa

References

Bibliography

External links
 

Ahmadiyya places
Cities and towns in Gurdaspur district